Valentin Hristov (born 30 March 1994) is a Bulgarian naturalized Azerbaijani weightlifter. He was initially awarded and subsequently stripped of a bronze medal at the 2012 Summer Olympics, which would have been Azerbaijan's first-ever Olympic medal in this discipline.

Hristov's personal trainer is Zlatan Vanev. He has been competing for Azerbaijan since 2011.

Doping 

As a result of a positive drug test for Dehydromethyltestosterone (turinabol), he was disqualified from the 2013 European Championships and had received a two-year ban starting from the 9th of April 2013 till the 9th of April 2015.
Four other athletes from the Azerbaijani team also tested positive and as a result the federation has been forced to pay a fine of $500,000.

At the 2015 World Weightlifting Championships he was caught using Nandrolone, he was the original bronze medalist but has since had his results disqualified. He is banned from the 14th of December 2015 to the 14th of December 2023, this being a longer suspension due to it being his second offense. He was among 6 other athletes from the Azerbaijani team that tested positive.

On 22 December 2018, it was announced that as a consequence of the International Olympic Committee’s re-analysis program in connection with the 2012 London Olympic Games Hristov had tested positive for performance-enhancing drugs.

In March 2019 he was disqualified from the 2012 Summer Olympics after the re-analysis of his samples, and was stripped of the bronze medal. Hristov tested positive for oralturinabol.

References

External links

 Profile at sports-reference.com

1994 births
Living people
World Weightlifting Championships medalists
Bulgarian male weightlifters
Azerbaijani male weightlifters
Azerbaijani sportspeople in doping cases
Olympic weightlifters of Azerbaijan
Weightlifters at the 2012 Summer Olympics
Bulgarian emigrants to Azerbaijan
Naturalized citizens of Azerbaijan
Azerbaijani people of Bulgarian descent
Doping cases in weightlifting
Competitors stripped of Summer Olympics medals
European Weightlifting Championships medalists
People from Shumen